The 2011 Sioux Falls Storm season was the team's twelfth season as a professional indoor football franchise and third in the Indoor Football League (IFL). One of twenty-two teams competing in the IFL for the 2011 season, the Storm were members of the Great Plains Division of the United Conference.

Led by head coach Kurtiss Riggs, the Storm played their home games at the Sioux Falls Arena in Sioux Falls, South Dakota. Sioux Falls entered the 2011 season following a loss in the league's United Bowl championship game in 2010.

After a tornado dubbed the Father's Day Tornado hit Billings' Rimrock Auto Arena on June 20, 2010, causing major damage, the Outlaws franchise folded, and their star quarterback Chris Dixon signed with the Storm. Led by Dixon, Sioux Falls scored an astounding 1022 points on the 2011 regular season, with 70 or more points in 10 games and opening with a 105-71 win over the Kent Predators in Kent, Washington. Only twice did the Storm fall short of 50 points and both were against the Omaha Beef, who handed them a 41-37 loss in the regular season finale after Sioux Falls had started 13-0. The two teams met in the next game, which was the playoff opener. The Storm won it, 52-39, then beat Green Bay 52-12 to return to the United Bowl. Although they tied their lowest scoring game of the season, Sioux Falls rolled over the Tri-Cities Fever 37-10 to earn the league championship after a two-year hiatus and also win its first IFL title.

Schedule
Key:

Regular season
All start times are local time

Post-season

Roster

Standings

References

External links
Sioux Falls Storm official statistics
2011 IFL regular season schedule

Sioux Falls Storm
Sioux Falls Storm
Sioux Falls Storm
United Bowl champion seasons